North-Methanocarbathymidine (N-MCT) is an antiviral drug which is an analogue of thymidine, and shows activity against herpesviruses, orthopoxviruses and HIV, though it has not been introduced into clinical use.

References 

Antiviral drugs